Max Hoff may refer to:

 Max Hoff (mobster) (1892–1941), Jewish boxer and gambler
 Max Hoff (illustrator) (1903–1985), Austrian illustrator
 Max Hoff (canoeist) (born 1982), German sprint canoeist